N'Gangue M'voumbe Niambi was the king of Loango in the latter half of the 17th century. He profited handsomely from the Portuguese slave trade, which had recently begun. Olfert Dapper reported that Niambi possessed several firearms, although he didn't know how to use them.

References
Dapper, Olfert, Description of Africa, 1668.

African slave traders
17th-century monarchs in Africa
History of the Republic of the Congo
Kingdom of Loango